Mad as a Hatter is the debut EP by Australian hip hop group Def Wish Cast. It was released in 1992 on vinyl by Random Records. All production and turntablism is by DJ Vame, except "Proppa Ragga", which was produced by DJ Sing. "Proppa Ragga" was the first Australian hip hop track to receive international recognition, albeit in Norway, coming in at number 2 on its NRK's Hip Hop show (hosted by Tommy Tee). In 2007, a copy of Mad as a Hatter sold on eBay to a German bidder for more than A$430. The EP samples Walt Disney's Alice in Wonderland in the title track.

Track listing 
Side A
"Papertrack Novel" – 3.32
"Daily Nightmare" – 3.26

Side B
"Mad as a Hatter" – 5.49
"Proppa Ragga" – 3.08

References

External links 
The Rap Cella
Total Sound Recordings
Mad As A Hatter on discogs.com
Def Wish Cast on Myspace

1992 EPs
Def Wish Cast albums